João Francisco Maia (24 October 1899 – ?)  was a Portuguese footballer who played as a forward.

External links 
 
 

1899 births
Year of death missing
Portuguese footballers
Association football forwards
Sporting CP footballers
Portugal international footballers
Footballers from Lisbon